Édgar Orlando Gaitán Camacho, also known as "El Taita", is a human rights activist, healer, spiritual teacher, and expert in the indigenous plant medicine and shamanic traditions of Colombia. Monica Briceño Robles accepts that Gaitan Camacho was briefly president of the  Association of Peasant Workers of the Carare (Asociación de Trabajadores Campesinos del Carare (ATCC)), which he helped form to find a solution to the violence caused by conflicts between the Colombian military, guerrillas, and paramilitary groups in the Carare region.

He was born in 1958 in the Carare-Opón region of Magdalena Medio, Santander Province, Colombia. Monica Briceño Robles said: Orlando Gaitán Camacho spent his youth in the mountains of Carare where he learned about the use of traditional medicine from his grandmother Salomé, who was one of the last full-blood Carare. As a child and as a young man he traveled extensively with his family through rural regions of Colombia, where he developed knowledge and expertise with traditional plant medicines, including Ayahuasca, and the cultural practices surrounding their use. Later he became an apprentice to shamans in Putumayo, Caquetá and Chocó Provinces.

Currently, he attends patients and provides spiritual guidance and leadership to communities in Colombia, Mexico, and the United States. He develops remedies and directs rituals and ceremonies, including Yagé in Bogotá, Medellin, Bucaramanga, Pasto, and on the Atlantic Coast. His lifelong mission is to recover human senses that have been suppressed and nearly lost. He is also active in the ongoing work of reconciliation and recovery in Colombia's journey towards peace and stability, helping organize a ritual (based on traditional indigenous practices) at the demolition of Medellin's former headquarters of drug cartel leader Pablo Escobar.

Criminal convictions
Camacho is a convicted rapist. The criminal complaint process began in 2012 in the prosecutor's office of Villeta, Cundinamarca, Colombia; there are nine complaints of women for sexual abuse against the perpetrator Orlando Gaitan Camacho. Four of these complaints are made by minors, (one of 14 and another of 17 years). All the denunciations are about sexual abuse exercised by Edgar Orlando Gaitán Camacho within healings in yagé ceremony and other spaces.

These complaints showed the perpetrator Orlando Gaitan Camacho, peasant man, farm administrator, a contractor providing services with the state, who posed as "alternative peace Nobel prize," "Taita de yagé" and self-called "last indigenous Carare" for placing the victims in an inability to resist and abuse them. The perpetrator Orlando Gaitán was in 2015 in Villeta prison (Cundinamarca) under insurance measure, he left in 2016 due to the expiration of terms.

At this time, the criminal process enters the second instance, and the announcement of the ruling was made by the judge who is handling the case in Guaduas Cundinamarca. Guilt was only ruled for three minors. All nine complaints are for the crime of "carnal access in person put in an inability to resist."

The Office of the Prosecutor already presented evidence and concepts from Colombian indigenous organizations who responded that Orlando Gaitán does not belong to any recognized community, likewise The Right Livelihood Award Foundation, the Swedish organization that annually awards the "Alternative Nobel Prize," clarified to the media. Communication that Orlando Gaitán, was never distinguished with this award. In the same way, expert reports on legal medicine were presented by each of the victims, where their vulnerability and defenselessness were shown.

This one is not the only case. So, for that reason the accusing agency ignited the alarms at the time in the media: "A cultural phenomenon called 'neochamanism' is being spread, managed by people who, supposedly, do spiritual cleansing", taking advantage of urban people who do not know the indigenous practices, they have hope of being cured and of finding answers to their existence ".

Books 
The Path to Eternity. El Sendero de la Eternidad. Orlando Gaitán Camacho. Bogota Colombia 2010.

References

External links
Sexual abuse in the contexts of ritual use of ayuahuasca. Alhena Caicedo Fernandez, Ph.D.
Ayahuasca Shamanism in the Amazon and Beyond. Beatriz Caiuby Labate and Clancy Cavnar. . Oxford Scholarship Online. 2014.
El falso chamán que abusada de mujeres durante el yagé Las igualadas. 2019.
Ayahuasca Community Guide for the Awareness of Sexual Abuse. Chacruna. 2019.
Indigenous Movements in Latin America, 1992–2004: Controversies, Ironies, New Directions. Jean E. Jackson and Kay B. Warren. 2005
The Right Livelihood Award Sweden's alternative Peace Prize

Academic works done by his followers 

 Las coordenadas del cielo músicas en las ceremonias de Yajé del Taita Orlando Gaitán. Briceño Robles, Mónica Sofía. Tesis de Maestría en Antropología. Universidad Nacional de Colombia. Bogotá. 2014.
 La memoria del humilde corazón. Un acercamiento a la vivencia del tiempo en la cultura del yagé. Sansón Torres, Paulo Andrés. Tesis de pregrado en Historia. Pontificia Universidad Javeriana. Bogotá. 2006.

Video and film 
El falso chamán que abusaba de mujeres durante el yagé Las igualadas. 2019.
La recuperación de la memoria - la identidad ancestral. The Vrinda Project. 2011.
La Construcción de la paz y la recuperación de la memoria ancestral. The Vrinda Project. 2011.
Camino del Yagé. Productos Audiovisuales. Fundación Carare [Bucaramanga] (2006) [Sánchez B.] Pontificia Universidad Javeriana [Bogotá] Número de acceso: pujbc.718527. Base de datos: Catálogo Biblos. Fotografía Martín Duarte. Edición Oliver Castelblanco. Musica Orlando Gaitán. 2006.
Abc del camino del Yagé. Documental realizado por la Fundación Carare en asociación con Proyecto de Bajo Presupuesto, Arte con amor y Waira Producciones.  Fotografía Martín Duarte. Edición y mezcla de sonido Luis Izquierdo. Masterización Oliver Castiblanco. Música incidental Orlando Gaitán. Producción. 2008.

1958 births
Colombian human rights activists
People from Santander Department
Living people
Colombian people convicted of rape